Alexander Niklas Meyer-Schade (born 13 April 1991) is a German professional footballer who plays as a goalkeeper for Bundesliga club Borussia Dortmund.

Career
In August 2017, Meyer joined Bundesliga club VfB Stuttgart. After not making a first team appearance in two seasons, he joined second-division club Jahn Regensburg in 2019. He made his professional debut for Regensburg in the 2. Bundesliga on 28 July 2019, starting in the home match against VfL Bochum.

In 2022, he joined Bundesliga club Borussia Dortmund. He made his debut in a 3–0 win over FC Copenhagen in the 2022–23 UEFA Champions League, keeping a clean sheet in the first top flight match of his career.

Career statistics

References

External links
 Profile at the Borussia Dortmund website
 
 

1991 births
Living people
People from Bad Oldesloe
Footballers from Schleswig-Holstein
German footballers
Association football goalkeepers
Hamburger SV II players
TSV Havelse players
FC Energie Cottbus players
VfB Stuttgart players
VfB Stuttgart II players
SSV Jahn Regensburg players
2. Bundesliga players
Regionalliga players